Ponta Temerosa is a headland on the island of Santiago, Cape Verde. Located in the south of the capital Praia, it is the southernmost point of the island. It is 2 km south from the city center. The lighthouse Farol de D. Maria Pia stands at the eastern point of the headland, marking the entrance to the Praia Harbour.

References

Geography of Santiago, Cape Verde
Praia
Headlands of Cape Verde